The 1964 Shell Le Mans 6 Hour Race was an endurance motor race open to Sports Cars and Touring Cars. The event was held at the Caversham circuit in Western Australia on the Foundation Day Holiday Monday, 1 June 1964.

Results

References

Further reading
 Australian Motor Sport, August 1964, page 52-53
 Terry Walker, Around The Houses, 1980, page 58

External links
 Race Numbers  Retrieved from www.terrywalkersplace.com on 27 August 2008

Six Hours Le Mans
Shell Le Mans 6 Hour Race